The 1936 United States Senate special election in Minnesota took place on November 3, 1936. The election was held to fill the vacancy in the seat formerly held by Thomas D. Schall for the final two months of Schall's unexpired term. Governor Floyd B. Olson had appointed Elmer Benson to fill the seat in 1935, but this appointment was temporary and subject to a special election held in the next general election year thereafter—1936. Benson opted to run for governor instead of running for election to continue for the remainder of the term. No special primaries were held for the special election, and No special primaries were held for the special election, among Minnesota's three major parties, only the Republican Party of Minnesota officially fielded a candidate—Guy V. Howard. Regardless of the absence of Farmer-Labor and Democratic nominees, Howard nevertheless faced a great degree of competition from independent candidates Nathaniel J. Holmberg, Andrew Olaf Devold, and John G. Alexander.

Candidates
 John G. Alexander (I), Attorney and real estate manager
 Andrew Olaf Devold (I), Attorney, State Senator since 1919, former State Representative (1915-1919); a member of the Farmer-Labor Party of Minnesota and formerly a member of the Socialist Party of Minnesota
 N. J. Holmberg (I), Former State Senator (1915-1919) and State Representative (1907-1915); a member of the Republican Party of Minnesota
 Guy V. Howard (R), Businessman and Republican elector in the 1916 presidential election

Special election

Results

See also 
 United States Senate elections, 1936 and 1937

References

Minnesota 1936
Minnesota 1936
1936 Special
Minnesota Special
United States Senate Special
United States Senate 1936